Students of the University of California at Davis who attend sporting events can join the Aggie Pack, the largest student-run university spirit organization in the United States. The Aggie Pack was started in 1992 as an attempt to increase attendance at games and events, and was successful. Membership is free and automatic for students, offers chances to win merchandise and food, and provides a very raucous encouragement to the athletes. Students band together as one large group, invent cheers, and support the UC Davis Aggies with their enthusiasm. In past recent years, the more energetic members of the Pack, known as Aggie Pack Extremists, tended to dress up in elaborate yale blue and gold costumes and dairy cow makeup. One Aggie Pack cheer is "Go Ags!". The Aggie Pack, as well as the crowd, sing the Aggie Fight song during sporting events.

Aggie Fight Song 
Lift up your voices, now's the time to sing.
This is the day the Victory Bell will ring.
Loyal Aggies, all for one.
Never stopping 'til we've won,
Because the Mustang will show our team the way to fight,
Charging the enemy with all his might.
Let's go. Let's win. Today's the day
The Aggies will fight! Fight! Fight!

History  
The beginnings of the Aggie Pack date to the early 1990s. The organization is the brainchild of Larry Swanson, associate director of athletics. In 1992, he asked one of his student interns, Scott Brayton, to start a spirit group that would increase attendance and spirit at athletic events. The first official Aggie Pack event was a basketball game in January 1993, and Brayton recalls 15 students signing up to join the group.

Not coincidentally, Brayton also happened to serve as the student-athlete public face behind the campaigns to pass the Student Services Maintenance Fee (SSMF) in 1993 and Student Activities and Services Initiative Fee (SASI) in 1995. Members of the Aggie Pack just happened to be the front-line volunteers in the campaign to pass the SSMF and the SASI. In other words, a university-support group served as a political action committee and campaign organization to pass student fee increases favored by the UC Davis administration.

Also not coincidentally, Scott Brayton, who was an Athletics Department "intern" at the time, was rewarded for the passage of the SSMF and SASI by Bob Franks (Associate Vice Chancellor—Student Affairs) and Larry Swanson (Associate Athletics Director) with a full-time career position in the UC Davis Athletics Department and is currently "Associate Athletics Director / Auction, Marketing and Promotions."

Membership increased as the Aggie Pack leadership recognized the usefulness of incentives. Since the early days in 1993, students who joined the group were given a free Aggie Pack t-shirt. In 1994, coordinator Phil Champlin introduced the concept of "madness." These in-game giveaways were meant to reward the fans who were cheering the most. It began with the Aggie Pack's trademark candy madness, and has now expanded to include burrito, tube sock, Pita Pit and pizza madness.

The organization continued to expand under the leadership of Kenny Kane. Kane was the master of ceremonies at Aggie Pack events from 1994 to 1996, and most students across campus knew him as the "Chickenman." Under his direction, the Pack expanded to all intercollegiate sports offered by the campus. It was also during this time that the Aggie Pack Extremists (APES) made their debut. The APES were dedicated students who did a lot of the behind the scenes work, although most students knew them as the colorful characters who led the crowd during the games. Some famous Aggie Pack characters include Superpope, The Men in Kilts, the Cow Brothers, the Burrito Bomber, the Aggie Elves, the GI Aggies, Harley Davis, and many more.

Many wondered where the organization would turn to after Kane's departure in 1996, but the Pack fell into the more than capable hands of Brian Rocca. He assumed Kane's job as master of ceremonies and thrilled the Aggie Pack as Indiana Aggie. During Rocca's tenure as leader, the Aggie Pack became known for its performance skits. These included the Village People, Vanilla Ice, the Jackson 5, Thriller, Riverdance and many more. Rocca, with the help of Adam Benedict, also created Aggie Jam, UC Davis' own basketball midnight madness. And it was also under his leadership that the annual Break the Record Night became one of the marquee events in the entire Davis community.

The Aggie Pack hit some rough waters after Rocca's graduation in 1999, but it has survived. Today the Aggie Pack is stronger than ever. With blue shirts and amazing upsets over Stanford the Aggie Pack has cemented itself as a major part of the UC Davis experience. As UC Davis is now Division I status, Aggie Pack aspires to make UC Davis as renowned in sports as Cal or UCLA.

References

External links
Aggie Pack website
Aggie Pack Davis Wiki

UC Davis Aggies